Lorilee may refer to:

Lorilee Craker (born 1968), Canadian-American writer
Miss Lorilee Lee, a character in the film High School U.S.A.
"Lorilee", a song first appearing the David Gates album First
Note that the versions of the above song have been done by other artists such as the band Bread (also featuring Gates)

See also
Lorelei
Lorelei (disambiguation)
"Lorile" or "Lori Le", a song from The Headies 2008
Lori Lee